The Paralympic Committee of Iran is the body responsible for selecting athletes to represent Iran at the Paralympic Games and other international athletic meets and for managing the Iranian teams at the events.

Presidents

See also
National Olympic Committee of the Islamic Republic of Iran

References

Parasports organizations
Iran Paralympic committee
Paralympic
Disability organisations based in Iran
2001 establishments in Iran